Coleophora denticulata is a moth of the family Coleophoridae. It is found in Tibet.

The wingspan is about 14 mm.

References

denticulata
Moths described in 1989
Moths of Asia